The Navigators is a worldwide Christian para-church organization based in Colorado Springs, Colorado. Its purpose is the discipling (training) of Christians with a particular emphasis on enabling them to share their faith with others. The organization's calling statement is "to advance the Gospel of Jesus and His Kingdom into the nations through spiritual generations of laborers living and discipling among the lost."

The Navigators works alongside local churches by providing resources such as Bible study booklets and study aid materials, Scripture memory aids, and Christian-oriented books.  These are produced through the organization's NavPress publishing group, which also offers The Message Bible paraphrase.

On January 1, 2005, Michael W. Treneer succeeded Dr. Jerry White as The Navigators' international president. White had served in that capacity for the previous 18 years. On April 18, 2015, Mutua Mahiaini succeeded Michael Treneer as the fifth International President of The Navigators.

History

The Navigators was founded in 1933 by the evangelist Dawson Trotman, who mentored United States Navy sailor Lester Spencer aboard . Due to those efforts, 135 additional sailors on Spencer's ship became Christians before it was sunk at Pearl Harbor. By the end of World War II, thousands of men on ships and bases around the world were learning through The Navigators.

The collegiate ministry of The Navigators was founded in 1951 at the University of Nebraska-Lincoln. This ministry was established by a group of students in the Sigma Nu fraternity house who, along with Trotman, decided to spread their outreach onto the college campus.

Move to Glen Eyrie

In 1953, The Navigators acquired its current headquarters location at Glen Eyrie through the Billy Graham Evangelistic Association's sale of the then-vacant property to Trotman's organization. As the result of a well-organized fundraising effort (despite an extremely tight deadline), friends and supporters of The Navigators provided the money needed to purchase the site. Today, The Navigators organize and offer over 100 Christian conferences, retreats, and programs each year at Glen Eyrie.

The main administrative center for the Navigators is situated towards the northeast region of Glen Eyrie's territory. It serves as the main hub for coordinating their various activities and operations."

Controversy

The Navigators organization was cited in a lawsuit against the United States Air Force Academy (USAFA) by Michael L. "Mickey" Weinstein of the Military Religious Freedom Foundation (MRFF)  in 2005. The lawsuit alleged that Darren and Gina Lindblom, assigned to the USAFA through The Navigators, were favored by the Air Force to the exclusion of other religious groups in violation of the Establishment Clause of the United States Constitution. This lawsuit was dismissed. Additional lawsuits by the MRFF have named The Navigators in similar complaints of alleged proselytizing in the military. In Korea, The Navigators sued six former members of the MRFF for libel in 2011. The case was initially dismissed, and again dismissed on appeal.

References

External links
NavPress
Glen Eyrie Conference Center
Navigators Audio Messages

Evangelical parachurch organizations
Religion in Colorado Springs, Colorado
Non-profit organizations based in Colorado
Evangelicalism in Colorado
Christian organizations established in 1933
Organizations based in Colorado Springs, Colorado
Christian organizations established in the 20th century
1933 establishments in the United States